Keir Dillon (born June 1, 1977) is a professional snowboarder specializing in Halfpipe.

Career
Dillon has been a competitive snowboarder since 1997; his current home mountain is Ponto Beach, California but originally he grew up riding the east coast of PA and NY. He has accumulated two bronze medals at the winter X Games, took back to back gold at the World Superpipe championships in 04/05, and has secured second and third place at the United States Open. He missed the 2006 season with a torn labrum in his left shoulder.

Dillon is a member of the Frends Crew (spelled without the "i" to emphasize the collective nature of the group) made up of snowboarders Mason Aguirre, Kevin Pearce, Danny Davis, Scotty Lago, Jack Mitrani and Luke Mitrani.  Frends is group of riders who turned their initial friendship into a formal alliance in 2007 to move the sport away from its recent competitive and business focus and return the sport to its grass roots, collegial beginnings.

His sponsors include Amp Beverages and Nike 6.0.

Films
 VICTIMS (1994)
 VHS produced by Eastern Edge and Apocalypse Snowboards. Featuring Kier Dillion, Ryan Mrachek, Noah Brandon, Seth Neary, Jason King, Todd Richards, and Peter Line. Footage from Killington VT, Mt. Hood, and the US Open at Stratton.
 Snow Blind
 Behind-the-scenes figures talk about the history and philosophy behind snowboarding, as well as showing off some of their most spectacular moves on the powder.
 AU A Snowboarding Film (2006)
 Follow the US Olympic Snowboard team around the world as they compete to qualify for the fast approaching 2006 Winter Olympics.
 For Right or Wrong (2006)
 "For Right or Wrong" takes an inside look at what it's like to snowboard for a living and combines action and documentary-style footage about riders' lives on and off the hill.
 Stand & Deliver
 Pulse

Stunt work
 Stolen Good (2002)(stunt performer)
 "Stolen Good" traces the lives of three friends whose personal entanglements are almost as unpredictable as the sport they've grown to love, snowboarding.

Competitive achievements
 2nd, 2006 Nippon Open (Superpipe), Bandai, Japan
 3rd, 2006 Chevy Grand Prix 1-20 (Halfpipe), Mountain Creek, New Jersey
 1st, 2005 Middle Earth Superpipe (Halfpipe), Snow Park, New Zealand
 3rd, 2005 New Zealand Open (Halfpipe), Wanaka, New Zealand
 1st, 2005 World Superpipe Championships (Halfpipe), Park City, Utah
 3rd, 2005 Grand Prix #3 (Halfpipe), Mountain Creek, New Jersey
 3rd, 2005 Vans Cup (Halfpipe), Northstar-at-Tahoe, California
 2nd, 2005 European Open (Halfpipe), Laax, Switzerland
 3rd, 2004 Middle Earth Superpipe Championships (Halfpipe), Snow Park, New Zealand
 3rd, 2004 United States Open (Halfpipe), Stratton, Vermont
 1st, 2004 World Superpipe Championships (Halfpipe), Park City, Utah
 1st, 2002 United States Grand Prix #1 02/03 (Halfpipe), Park City, Utah
 2nd, 2002 Ripzone Invitational (Halfpipe), Blackcomb, BC Canada
 2nd, 2002 United States Open (Quarterpipe), Stratton, Vermont
 3rd, 2002 United States Open (Halfpipe), Stratton, Vermont
 2nd, 2002 Grand Prix #4 (Halfpipe), Breckenridge, Colorado

X-Games
 3rd, Winter 2004 (Snowboard Superpipe)
 3rd, Winter 2002 (Snowboard Superpipe)

Various competition results/information taken from EXPN

References

External links
Official Site of Professional Snowboarder Keir Dillon
Fuel TV Keir Dillon First Hand
EXPN Keir Dillon Interview
Keir Dillon's go211.com page
YouTube Keir Dillon profile
Keir Dillon NASA.gov Commercial
FIS-Ski.com Biography/Results

Living people
American male freestyle skiers
1977 births